Tom Kent (born in Winston-Salem, North Carolina), is an American radio personality and author. As the head of the Tom Kent Radio Network (TKRN), Tom hosts and produces syndicated daily, weekend and, 24/7 programming each week on approximately 600 stations. The majority of Kent's programming is centered on  classic hits and adult contemporary music formats, with selected programming made available to stations of any music format.
 There are 24 different syndicated radio products available on TKRN and are heard in seven different formats.

Biography

Prior to becoming syndicated, Kent worked on the air and in programming at the top 40 radio station WLS in Chicago.  Kent also worked on the air at KLIF in Dallas, WIBG Philadelphia, WGCL and WIXY in Cleveland, WMXJ in Miami, WAVA-FM in Washington, D.C. where he was also the Program Director, and WBZZ (B-94) Pittsburgh.

In addition, Kent worked in the music industry as a promotion executive for Elektra Entertainment, which was a division of Time-Warner's Warner Music Group.  While an executive at Elektra, Kent received many awards including "Promotion Rookie of the Year" and "Promotion Executive of the Year" both separate and individual awards in different years.  He helped break and bring to the national music spotlight national music recording artists Tracy Chapman, Third Eye Blind, Keith Sweat, Moby, Natalie Merchant, Simply Red, Missy Elliott, Gerald Levert, Metallica, Yolanda Adams, and En Vogue.

On August 6, 2015, The National Radio Hall of Fame in Chicago nominated Tom Kent in the category of syndicated music personality.

Syndication

On June 29, 2002, Kent launched the Tom Kent Organization and its radio network, the TKO Radio Network. It was here that Kent launched what was then oldies programming, centered around the decades of 1964 to 1973. Drawing on inspiration from classic Top 40 disc jockeys, Kent's goal was to create a broad-based persona that, while still appealing to the "adult power demo" (persons 25 to 54, many of whom listened to Top 40 radio at a young age), would be enjoyed by all ages. During this time, Kent created and hosted the programs "Into the Seventies," a five-hour weekly program devoted to 1970s music, and "Hall of Fame Coast to Coast", a general six-day-a-week oldies program. The programming was immensely successful and significantly boosted ratings on the stations it aired. In 2006, Kent turned the network into the "Classic Top 40" network, renaming the weeknight show from "Hall of Fame Coast to Coast" to "Classic Top 40 Weeknights." The long-term goal was to create a 24-hour network out of this with similar programming.

Exactly five years after Kent launched the network, on June 29, 2007, he resigned as host and sold the company.

Tom Kent Radio Network

Kent then launched a new network, the Tom Kent Radio Network. Programs include a five-hour totally live daily show called, "The Music Magazine" as well as weekend shows: "The Ultimate Party" (a live five-hour Saturday evening party show) and "My 70s Show" (a five-hour 70s show). Other offerings include "Powerline" hosted by Brother Jon Rivers (based on the original Powerline radio program that was produced by the Southern Baptist Convention from 1969 until 2003 and was also hosted by Rivers), "Totally 90s Now", "Lovin Life, Livin the 80s", "Sweet Soul Weekend with Jeff Foxx", "TK 2K", "The Classic Hits Countdown", "The Diva Diner", "Bill Shannon", and "Steve Kent".  "Tom Kent Afternoons", "CLASS", "Voiceover Production Services".  The Tom Kent Radio Network  has more than 600 affiliates since its launch in March 2008, reaching nearly 100 million listeners.

On April 18, 2011, The Tom Kent Radio Network launched a 24-hour Classic Hits network called "24/7 FUN". The network features in the morning, Steve Kent and Jackie Newton mid-days and, Tom Kent on afternoons and nights along with Brother Jon Rivers and Jeff Foxx weekends.  

Upon launching TKRN, Kent entered into a distribution and sales agreement with Jones Radio Network in March 2008 and then in February 2009, with ABC Radio Network. Since February 2012, Kent has employed sales and distribution services through United Stations Radio Networks.

Personal life

Kent lives in suburban Cleveland, Ohio with his wife Karen Marie.  Kent and his family moved back to Cleveland in 1988 and have lived there since. Two of Kent's three grown children host radio shows on 24/7 FUN.  They are Jackie Newton weekday middays from 9a to 12p eastern along with "The Diva Diner" at noon and Steve Kent hosts 1p to 4p weekdays. Tom Kent's wife Karen Marie works behind the scenes at the network.

References

External links
Tom Kent's official Web site with daily and weekend shows
Tom Kent's 70s show Web site
Tom Kent's The Ultimate Party Show
The Tom Kent Collection at ReelRadio.com
Tom Kent at WLS Radio

American radio personalities
Radio personalities from Cleveland
People from Winston-Salem, North Carolina
Year of birth missing (living people)
Living people